Good Friends may refer to:

Music
Good Friends (Adam Brand album), 2000 album by Adam Brand
"Good Friends" (Jake Shears song), 2018 song by Jake Shears 
Good Friends (Livingston Taylor album), 1993 album by Livingston Taylor

Other uses
"Good Friends" (book), 1994 short story from the Goosebump book series
Good Friends (militant group), Pakistan

See also
Friendship
Good Neighbours (disambiguation)
Just Good Friends (disambiguation)